Opoki may refer to:
Opoki, Poland, a village in Poland
Opoki, Russia, name of several rural localities in Russia